KMCS (93.1 MHz) is a commercial FM radio station licensed to Muscatine, Iowa and serving parts of Iowa and Illinois, including sections of the Quad Cities. It airs a mainstream rock format under the branding 93.1 The Buzz. The station is owned by Jam Media Solutions, LLC. The transmitter for KMCS is co-located with the transmitter of AM sister station KWPC in northwest Muscatine.

When not playing music, KMCS broadcasts Iowa Hawkeye Football.

History

Call sign history
The Muscatine allocation for 93.1 MHz signed on the air in June 1996 as KWCC, and switched to its current KMCS call sign on November 2, 2005.

93 Country
The former KWCC was branded as 93 Country from its inauguration in 1996 until 2005. During this time, the station played a country music format, and mixed modern country with classic country. Syndicated programming included "Colleen's Classic Country USA" and "The Crook & Chase Countdown."

Mac FM 94.7 - 93.1 (2005-2013)
In November 2005, the station switched to an adult hits format, along with Clinton-based sister station KZEG. Both stations were branded as "Mac FM," with the Muscatine station changing its call letters to KMCS (to stand for "Mac South"); KZEG switched its call letters to KMCN, to stand for "Mac North." The music mix included rock, pop and soul music, generally from the early 1970s to the present day.

George Lowe was the radio voice for "Mac 93.1 FM."

Vintage Sound 93.1 FM (2013-2019)
The "Vintage Sound 93.1" format debuted on January 14, 2013, and was exclusive to the frequency; KMCN continued with the "Mac FM" format. The format featured classic rock along with less-mainstream rock, classic blues and other genres. The on-air lineup includes "The Tony Tone Show" weekday mornings, Wes Jordan in middays, Pippa in afternoons, and the syndicated night show "Nights with Alice Cooper", which began in April 2014. All three local personalities were previously heard on KBEA-FM in the Quad Cities.

93.1 The Buzz (2019-present)
On December 9, 2019, at 7 a.m., KMCS flipped to mainstream rock, branded as "93.1 The Buzz".

Previous logo

References

External links
93.1 The Buzz Online

MCS
Radio stations in the Quad Cities
Radio stations established in 1996
Mainstream rock radio stations in the United States